Alfred William Rutherford FRS is Professor and Chair in Biochemistry of Solar energy in the Department of Life sciences at Imperial College London.

Education
Rutherford was educated at King Edward VI Grammar School for Boys, Morpeth and the University of Liverpool where he was awarded a Bachelor of Science degree in Biochemistry in 1976. He moved to University College London (UCL) where he was awarded a PhD in 1979 for electron paramagnetic resonance studies of photosynthetic electron transport in purple bacteria supervised by Michael C.W. Evans.

Research
Rutherford's research investigates: 

Rutherford's research has been funded by the Biotechnology and Biological Sciences Research Council (BBSRC), the Wolfson Foundation and the Royal Society.

Awards and honours
Rutherford was elected a Fellow of the Royal Society (FRS) in 2014. His nomination reads: 

Rutherford has also been awarded the Royal Society Wolfson Research Merit Award, the Médaille d'argent of the Centre National de la Recherche Scientifique (CNRS) in 2001 and was elected a member of the European Molecular Biology Organization (EMBO) in 2001. On 25 January 2013 Rutherford received an honorary doctorate from the Faculty of Science and Technology at Uppsala University, Sweden.

Personal life
Rutherford is a musician and has been a member of The Baskervilles Blues Band and Baskerville Willy.

References

Living people
Fellows of the Royal Society
Royal Society Wolfson Research Merit Award holders
Alumni of the University of Liverpool
Alumni of University College London
Academics of Imperial College London
Members of the European Molecular Biology Organization
1955 births